John W. Rhodes is an American politician and businessman who served as a member of the North Carolina House of Representatives from 2003 to 2007. A real estate broker from Huntersville, North Carolina, Rhodes represented the 98th district. He was defeated in the 2006 Republican primary by Thom Tillis.

Career
Rhodes was the first member of the North Carolina House to call for the resignation of Speaker Jim Black, after Black was accused of ethics violations and malfeasance. Black later resigned from the House after winning re-election in 2006 and was convicted on state and federal charges in 2007.

Rhodes ran as a write-in candidate for the U.S. Senate in 2014. In unofficial results, the state reported that Rhodes had received 621 votes.

Electoral history

2006

2004

2002

References

Living people
Year of birth missing (living people)
People from Huntersville, North Carolina
21st-century American politicians
Republican Party members of the North Carolina House of Representatives